Zhang Xiangxiang (born July 16, 1983 in Longyan, Fujian) is a retired male Chinese weightlifter. He won the bronze medal in the 56 kg class at the 2000 Olympics in Sydney. Zhang later won the gold medal in the 62 kg class at the 2008 Olympics in Beijing.

See also
China at the 2008 Summer Olympics

References

Olympic bronze medalists for China
Olympic gold medalists for China
Olympic weightlifters of China
People from Longyan
Weightlifters at the 2000 Summer Olympics
Weightlifters at the 2008 Summer Olympics
1983 births
Living people
Olympic medalists in weightlifting
Weightlifters from Fujian
Medalists at the 2008 Summer Olympics
Chinese male weightlifters
Medalists at the 2000 Summer Olympics
21st-century Chinese people